ATP-binding cassette sub-family B member 9 is a protein that in humans is encoded by the ABCB9 gene.

The membrane-associated protein encoded by this gene is a member of the superfamily of ATP-binding cassette (ABC) transporters. ABC proteins transport various molecules across extra- and intra-cellular membranes. ABC genes are divided into seven distinct subfamilies (ABC1, MDR/TAP, MRP, ALD, OABP, GCN20, White). This protein is a member of the MDR/TAP subfamily. Members of the MDR/TAP subfamily are involved in multidrug resistance as well as antigen presentation. The function of this half-transporter has not yet been determined; however, this protein may play a role in lysosomes. Alternative splicing of this gene results in distinct isoforms which are likely to have different substrate specifications.

See also
 ATP-binding cassette transporter

References

Further reading

External links 
 
 

ATP-binding cassette transporters